Weesp is a railway station in Weesp, Netherlands. The station has two island platforms and it has a total of six tracks, from which two tracks are for passing trains. The first station in Weesp opened on June 10, 1874, when the Gooilijn from Amsterdam to Hilversum and Amersfoort was completed. The original station was demolished in 1967 and replaced by a new building. The new building partially went out of service in 1985 because of the new railway line from Weesp to Almere and beyond, called the Flevolijn. The out-of-service part was later converted to a bicycle parking and repair shop. The remaining station is little more than a tunnel passing under the tracks, and a small coffee counter. Train services are operated by Nederlandse Spoorwegen.

Since the opening of the Flevolijn, Weesp has been a major transfer station for passengers travelling from Amsterdam Central Station and Schiphol from the east, and suburbs such as Almere and Hilversum to the west. Due to this circumstance, Weesp features 16 departures per hour. Until 2003, also passagers travelling between Hilversum and Almere had to change at Weesp. In that year a new branch, the Gooiboog, was added to connect the line towards Almere with the line towards Naarden-Bussum railway station and Hilversum.

The traveling time from Weesp to Amsterdam Centraal by train is about 15 minutes. The distance between the two is about 15 kilometers.

Train services
The following train services call at Weesp:

Bus services

External links
NS website 
Dutch Public Transport journey planner 
Information Station Weesp on NS website 

Railway stations in Amsterdam
Railway stations opened in 1874
Railway stations on the Flevolijn
Railway stations on the Zuidtak Ringspoorbaan
Weesp